Zuma is a genus of harvestman in the family Paranonychidae. There are at least two described species in Zuma, found in central and northern California.

Species
These two species belong to the genus Zuma:
 Zuma acuta C.J. Goodnight & M.L. Goodnight, 1942
 Zuma tioga Briggs, 1971

References

Further reading

 
 
 

Harvestmen